Daulat Beg Oldi (also Oldie, DBO) is a traditional campsite and current military base located in the midst of the Karakoram Range in northern Ladakh, India. It is on the historic trade route between Ladakh and the Tarim Basin, and is the last campsite before the Karakoram Pass. It is said to be named after Sultan Said Khan ("Daulat Beg"), who died here on his return journey from an invasion of Ladakh and Kashmir. Chip Chap River, the main headwater of the Shyok River, flows just to the south. The Line of Actual Control with Chinese-controlled Aksai Chin is five miles to the east.

An Indian border outpost was established here in the summer of 1960. An Advance Landing Ground was also constructed here, one of the world's highest airstrips. DBO now has a road link, the 235 km-long Darbuk-Shyok-DBO Road, completed by the Border Roads Organization in 2019 on a new improved alignment.

Location and physical conditions

The international border with China is 8 km to the north and the Line of Actual Control with Chinese-controlled Aksai Chin is 9 km to the east. Other than Siachen Glacier military bases, DBO is India's northernmost settlement. The nearest civilian town is Murgo to the south, which has a small population of Baltis.

The temperature plummets as low as -55 C in the winters. The weather deteriorates frequently with strong icy winds lashing much of DBO. DBO has very little if any vegetation or wildlife. Communication is possible only through INMARSAT (satellite) phones.

History

Expedition of Said Khan (Etymology)

Daulat Beg Oldi literally means "spot where the great and rich man died" in Turki. There are various folklore about whom this refers to—such as the tale about this place being the location where a large caravan was destroyed, or the tale about this place being the burial site of a rich man and his treasure.

According to British colonial-era surgeon Henry Walter Bellew, Daulat Baig Oldi means "the lord of the state died here", and the "lord" was early 16th-century Sultan Said Khan of the Yarkent Khanate. Said Khan purportedly died at this place while returning to Yarkent from a campaign in Ladakh. He is sometimes given the title of Ghaza for his military expeditions.

The account of this military expedition was recorded by his general, Mirza Muhammad Haidar Dughlat, who was the Sultan's first cousin, in the history titled Tarikh-i-Rashidi (تاریخ رشیدی) (History of Rashid).

In autumn 1531 (Safar 938 AH), Sultan Said Khan left Yarkand with Haidar and a few thousand men. On first crossing the Karakorum, the Sultan fell ill with severe altitude sickness, but managed to recover. In the course of a few months of campaigning, they were able to devastate Nubra Valley. As winter approached, they split forces. The Sultan left for Baltistan; Haidar left for Kashmir. In Baltistan, the Sultan encountered a population of friendly Muslims, but he turned on them, killing and enslaving them, possibly because they were Shiites which orthodox Yarkandi Sunnis considered. On the way to Kashmir, Haider defeated the Dras near Zoji La. In Kashmir, he and his troops were hosted by the king of Srinagar. In the spring, the two parties met up again in Maryul, and the Sultan decided to return to Yarkand, but instructed Haider to conquer Tibet for Islam before his departure.

On his way back to Yarkand in the summer of 1533 (end of 939 AH), the Sultan once again suffered severe altitude sickness. This time he succumbed near Karakoram Pass. Bellew argues that the location of his death was at Daulat Beg Oldi. News of the sultan's death led to a bloody struggle for the succession, ending in the ascension of Abdurashid Khan. Abdurashid Khan recalled the forces in Tibet and exiled Haidar. By then, Haidar had had some successes against the Changpa Tibetans of Baryang, but his forces suffered greatly from the altitude and elements. By the time the army returned to Yarkand, of the original several thousands, fewer than a dozen were left. The exiled Haidar took refuge with his maternal aunt in Badakhshan. He eventually joined the ranks of the Mughal Empire, where he wrote the Tarikh-i-Rashidi.

Modern era 
The trade route via the Karakoram Pass was used by caravans traveling between Leh and the Tarim Basin.  Daulat Beg Oldi was a halting point for the caravans. Filippo de Filippi, who explored the area in 1913–1914, described:

Filippi also wrote that the experienced caravaners passed through the Depsang Plains without stopping, travelling a distance of 31 miles between Daulat Beg Oldi and Murgo in a single day. Others stopped, either at Qizil Langar to the south of Depsang La, or at Burtsa further south.

The trading caravans declined during the 1940s during tensions in Xinjiang (Chinese Turkestan) and completely stopped in the 1950s. In 1953, the Indian consulate in Kashgar was closed down. Indian prime minister Jawaharlal Nehru told the Parliament that the Chinese wished to treat Xinjiang as a "closed area". Subsequently, China built the Xinjiang–Tibet Highway through Aksai Chin.

Sino-Indian border dispute 

The Republic of China (1912–1949), having faced a revolution in Tibet in 1911, apparently made secret plans to acquire Aksai Chin plateau in order to create a road link between Xinjiang and Tibet. These plans began to get manifested in public maps only towards the end of its rule.

While the Republic of China claims included the Aksai Chin proper, they stopped well behind the Karakoram mountains, leaving all the rivers that flow into the Shyok River within India, including the Chip Chap River. (See map.) Communist China also published the "Big Map of the People's Republic of China" in 1956 with a similar boundary, now called the 1956 claim line.

However, in 1960 China advanced its claim line further west, dissecting the Chip Chap River. The Chinese said little by way of justification for this advancement other than to claim that it was their "traditional customary boundary" which was allegedly formed through a "long historical process". They claimed that the line was altered in the recent past only due to "British imperialism".

Meanwhile, India continued to claim the entire Aksai Chin plateau.

1960–1962
A border post was established at Daulat Beg Oldi (DBO) in 1960 under the supervision of the Intelligence Bureau (IB). By September 1961, the Chinese had established a post in the Chip Chap Valley about 4 miles east of the DBO post as well as roads leading to it. The Indian Army then set up posts at Burtsa, Qizil Langar, at a 'track junction' in the Depsang Plains and at Sultan Chushku. These were intended to block any further extension of Chinese roads. The Intelligence Bureau post at DBO was also reinforced with an Army unit.

The DBO post was fired upon by Chinese forces during the Sino-Indian War on 21 July and 4 August 1962.

1962–present 
In April 2013, a platoon-sized contingent of the People's Liberation Army established a campsite 30 km southeast of DBO, a location in the Indian military's "DBO sector."  In reference to their own perception of the LAC's location, India initially claimed that the Chinese camp was 10 km on their side, later revising this to a 19 km claim, and claimed that Chinese military helicopters had violated Indian airspace during the incident. In early May, both sides withdrew their units further back.

Transportation

Advanced Landing Ground

The Indian Army maintains helipads and a gravel airstrip here, the highest airstrip in the world. Routine sorties are carried out using An-32 aircraft to provide relief and supplies to the troops stationed nearby. The base was established during the Sino-Indian conflict in 1962, with the first landing by Squadron Leader C.K.S Raje who set a record for the world's highest aircraft landing at the time. It was operated with American-supplied Fairchild Packets from 1962 to 1966, when
it had to be closed down suddenly when an earthquake caused loosening of the surface soil, making the area unsuitable for fixed-wing aircraft. Work was undertaken to make the airfield operational again, and was marked on 31 May 2008, when an Indian Air Force An-32 landed.

The Indian Air Force first landed transports here between 1962 and 1965 and then after a gap for 43 years, the IAF started landing at DBO in 2008. In a significant demonstration of its capabilities, the Indian Air Force landed a C-130J Super Hercules transport aircraft in Daulat Beg Oldie on 20 August 2013, thirty kilometers from where the 2013 Daulat Beg Oldi Incident took place in April 2013. This landing could qualify as a world record for a medium-lift aircraft landing at this altitude.

DS-DBO Road 
In 2001, the Indian government decided to construct a motorable road from Leh to Daulat Beg Oldi. The road was completed in 2019. The 255-km is Darbuk-Shyok-DBO Road (DS-DBO Road) runs at elevations between 4,000 and 5,000 metres (13,000–16,000 ft). It follows the old winter caravan route via the Shyok River valley going via Murgo, Burtsa Nala and Depsang Plains. The travel time is said to be six hours.

India-China Border Meeting point

Daulat Beg Oldi – Tianwendian is the highest of the five officially agreed Border Personnel Meeting points between the Indian Army and the People's Liberation Army of China for regular consultations and interactions between the two armies, which helps in defusing stand-offs. The first meeting at this location was held on August 1, 2015 (PLA Day).  The events included a Chinese cultural programme and other ceremonies meant to improve relations. Later in the month, India hosted a delegation from the PLA on the occasion of Indian Independence Day and celebrated with traditional songs and dances from Indian culture, Gatka martial arts, and motorcycle acrobatics performed by the Indian Army Corps of Signals. The first ceremonial BPM ever held on New Year's Day was here in 2016.

A meeting hut was constructed approximately a year after the meeting point was opened.

See also 
Fukche Advanced Landing Ground
Siachen Glacier
Depsang Plains
Thoise
Tianwendian
India-China Border Roads

Notes

References

Bibliography

External links
 IAF's ALG

Geography of Ladakh
Indian Air Force bases